Conflict is a 1936 American drama sport film directed by David Howard and starring John Wayne, Ward Bond and Jean Rogers.

Plot
Pat Glendon is a former lumberjack turned bare-knuckle boxer who travels the countryside as part of gambling scam operated by Gus "Knockout" Carrigan for a New York City syndicate.  Glendon arrives ahead of the travelling boxing exhibition, building the confidence of the locals who in turn bet on Glendon to win, only to have him throw the fight.

The gambling circuit leads Glendon to Cedar City, a west coast lumber town where he soon finds himself a job as a lumberjack and becoming part of the community.  At the lumberjack picnic Glendon fights and defeats "Ruffhouse" Kelly, a burly man from a rival lumber camp. The town folk agree that Glendon is the one to represent them in the boxing exhibition soon to hit town.

While in Cedar City, Glendon saves the life of a runaway orphan, Tommy, who befriends the boxer and acts as his "trainer" and is unofficially adopted by him.  Maude Sangster, a reporter pretending to be a social worker from San Francisco sent to Cedar City to expose the boxing scam, befriends Glendon and the orphan Tommy.

Conscience gets the better of Glendon, and on the day of the rigged fight against Carrigan, Glendon tells him that he won't throw the fight. He tells Carrigan that the Cedar City lumberjacks are his friends and he doesn't want to scam them out of their hard earned money.  In a hard-fought, honest match, Glendon prevails and also wins the heart of the girl.

Cast

 John Wayne as Pat Glendon
 Jean Rogers as Maude Sangster
 Ward Bond as Gus "Knockout" Carrigan
 Tommy Bupp as Tommy
 Bryant Washburn as City Editor
 Frank Sheridan as Sam Steubner
 Harry Woods as "Ruffhouse" Kelly
 Margaret Mann as Ma Blake
 Eddie Borden as "Spider" Welsh
 Frank Hagney as Mike Malone
 Lloyd Ingraham as Adams, Newspaper City Editor

Production
The railroad scenes were filmed on the Sierra Railroad in Tuolumne County, California.

See also
 John Wayne filmography

References

External links

 
 
 
 

1936 films
1930s sports drama films
American sports drama films
American black-and-white films
American boxing films
Films directed by David Howard
Films based on American novels
Films based on works by Jack London
1936 drama films
Universal Pictures films
1930s English-language films
1930s American films